Samuel R. Lieberman (September 20, 1921 – September 5, 1993) was an American professional basketball player. He played for the Syracuse Nationals in the National Basketball League for two games during their inaugural 1946–47 season and averaged 0.5 points per game.

References

1921 births
1993 deaths
American men's basketball players
Basketball players from Detroit
Centers (basketball)
Lawrence Tech Blue Devils men's basketball players
Sportspeople from Southfield, Michigan
Syracuse Nationals players